Abercarn is a small town and community in Caerphilly county borough, Wales. It is 10 miles (16 km) northwest of Newport on the A467 between Cwmcarn and Newbridge, within the historic boundaries of Monmouthshire.

History
An estate at Abercarn was owned by the ironmaster Richard Crawshay; in 1808, it passed to his son-in-law, the industrialist and politician Benjamin Hall.

The district was traditionally associated with the coal mining collieries, ironworks and tinplate works of the South Wales coalfield and South Wales Valleys, although all have now closed; the town, which lies in the middle portion of the Ebbw valley, being situated on the south-eastern flank of the once great mining region of Glamorgan and Monmouthshire.

On 11 September 1878, an underground explosion at the Prince of Wales Colliery killed 268 coal miners.

Local government
The area was part of the ancient Monmouthshire parish of Mynyddislwyn until the late 19th century. In 1892 a local board of health and local government district of Abercarn was formed. This became Abercarn urban district in 1894, governed by an urban district council of twelve members. Under the Local Government Act 1972 the urban district was abolished in 1974, becoming part of the borough of Islwyn, Gwent. Further local government organisation in 1996 placed the area in the county borough of Caerphilly. The former urban district corresponds to the three communities of Abercarn, Crumlin and Newbridge.

Sport
Abercarn is home to Abercarn Rugby Club which is a member of the Welsh Rugby Union, and to Abercarn United Football Club which plays in division one of the Gwent County League.

Transport

Bus 
The town is served by Stagecoach South Wales services including:

 X15 (from Newport to Brynmawr)
 151 gold (from Newport to Blackwood Interchange)

Rail 
The town is lies between Newbridge railway station and Crosskeys railway station, with the latter is slightly the closer of the two. Both are approximately a four-minute drive or thirty minute walk away. The town was formerly served by Abercarn railway station, which closed to passengers in April 1962.

Military 
Following the formation of the Territorial Force in 1908, the Abercarn Territorial Cadet Company was formed within the wider Army Cadet Force.  Following its formation the company was assigned to the 2nd Battalion, Monmouthshire Regiment.  In 1912 the company was affiliated with the new formed 1st Cadet Battalion, The Monmouthshire Regiment.

Notable people
The surgeon Sir Clement Price Thomas (1893–1973) was born in Abercarn. He was famous for his 1951 operation on King George VI.

Education

Abercarn Primary School 
 Ysgol Gymraeg Cwm Gwyddon (Welsh Medium Education School)

References

Towns in Caerphilly County Borough
Local Government Districts created by the Local Government Act 1858
Communities in Caerphilly County Borough